The 2014–15 Albanian Basketball Superleague, will be the 49th season of the top professional basketball league in Albania. The regular season started on 17 October 2014 and the defending champions were BC Vllaznia. The finals were contested between the regular season champions PBC Tirana and the holders BC Vllaznia, with BC Vllaznia retaining their title on 28 April 2015.

Clubs and Arenas

Regular season

League table

|}
Source: Eurobasket

Playoffs

Source: Albaniansport

External links
Albanian Basketball Federation site

Basketball
Basketball
Albania
Superleague